Merrillite is a calcium phosphate mineral with the chemical formula Ca9NaMg(PO4)7. It is an anhydrous, sodium-rich member of the merrillite group of minerals.

Mineral species, sub-group and group
Merrillite is a distinct mineral species but it also gives its name to a set of similar minerals, which together form the merrillite sub-group of minerals. The merrillite sub-group and the whitlockite sub-group together form the merrillite group of minerals.

Merrillite Group
Merrillite Sub-group 		
Ferromerrillite 
Keplerite 	
Matyhite
Merrillite
Whitlockite Sub-group 		
Hedegaardite 
Strontiowhitlockite
Whitlockite 
Wopmayite

In September 2022 the discovery of another merrillite group mineral, changesite–(Y), was announced, but, it is not yet clear where this new mineral sits in the merrillite group hierarchy.

Discovery and naming
Merrillite is named after George P. Merrill (1854–1929) of the Smithsonian Institution. In 1915, Merrill had described the mineral from four meteorites: Alfianello, Dhurmsala, Pultusk and Rich Mountain. However, it was not until 1975 that it was recognized as distinct from whitlockite by the International Mineralogical Association.

Occurrence
Merrillite is a very important constituent of extraterrestrial rocks. It occurs in lunar rocks and in meteorites (for example, pallasites and martian meteorites).

In 2022, for the first time, merrillite was found in a terrestrial environment, as an inclusion in lower-mantle diamonds from Sorriso River, Juína, Brazil.

References

Phosphate minerals
Meteorite minerals